"I Am... I Said" is a song written and recorded by Neil Diamond.  Released as a single on March 15, 1971, it was quite successful, at first slowly climbing the charts, then more quickly rising to number 4 on the U.S. pop singles chart by May 1971.  It fared similarly across the Atlantic, reaching number 4 on the UK pop singles chart as well.

Inspiration
"I Am... I Said", which took Diamond four months to compose, is one of his most intensely personal efforts, making reference to both Los Angeles and New York City. Diamond told Mojo magazine in July 2008 that the song came from a time he spent in therapy in Los Angeles. He said:  In the same month, he told Q that the song was written "to find [him]self" and added, "It's a tough thing for me to gather myself after singing that song."

But Diamond has also given another inspiration for this song: an unsuccessful tryout for a movie about the life and death of the comedian Lenny Bruce. Author David Wild interviewed Diamond for a 2008 book and he discussed how his efforts to channel Lenny Bruce evoked such intense emotions that it led him to spend some time in therapy.

Reception
Critical opinion on "I Am... I Said" has generally been positive, with Rolling Stone calling its lyric excellent in a 1972 review, while The New Yorker used it to exemplify Diamond's songwriting opaqueness in a 2006 retrospective.  Cash Box described the song as having "excellent production and performance."  A 2008 Diamond profile in The Daily Telegraph simply referred to the song's "raging existential angst," and Allmusic calls it "an impassioned statement of emotional turmoil... very much in tune with the confessional singer/songwriter movement of the time."

The song was not without its detractors, however. Humorist Dave Barry said:

The song garnered Diamond his first Grammy Awards nomination, for Best Pop Vocal Performance, Male.

Charts

Weekly charts

Year-end charts

Certifications

Other versions
"I Am... I Said" was included on Diamond's November 1971 album Stones.  The single version leads off the LP, while a reprise of the song, taken from midway to a variant ending with Diamond exclaiming "I am!", concludes. It has also been included in live versions on Diamond's Hot August Night (from 1972, in a performance that Rolling Stone would later label "fantastically overwrought").

Checkmates, Ltd. released a version of the song on their 1971 album, Life.  Brooke White performed the song on American Idol's seventh season during its Neil Diamond week, changing the lyric to replace New York City with her home state of Arizona. Among the foreign versions are the Italian language "La casa degli angeli" ("House of the angels"), performed by Caterina Caselli in 1971's album "Una grande emozione" ("A great emotion"), and by Dutchman Jan Rot on his 2008 album Hallelujah as "Zeg God... zeg ik", taking the title as someone who curses, while the Jewish word for God means 'I am'. The Brazilian singer Diana recorded the song as "Porque Brigamos" ("Why we argue") in 1972, with lyrics written by the composer and producer Rossini Pinto. The band Killdozer also covered the song on their 1987 album Little Baby Buntin'. Austrian singer Udo Wenders released a German version titled "Die Welt von heut" ("The world of today") on his 2012 album Ich finde dich. Jamaican reggae singer Mikey Spice released the album I Am I Said in 2014, including a cover of this song. John Gregory recorded an instrumental rendition of this song. There is also the Czech version "Krajem já šel" ("I went through the county"), realised in 1982 by the Czech singer Pavel Bobek.  Country artist Billy Ray Cyrus released a version of the song on his 2020 EP "Singin Hills Sessions Volume 1".

See also
 Dave Barry's Book of Bad Songs
 List of songs about Los Angeles
 List of songs about New York City

References

1971 songs
1971 singles
Checkmates, Ltd. songs
Irish Singles Chart number-one singles
Neil Diamond songs
Number-one singles in New Zealand
Songs about Los Angeles
Songs about New York City
Songs written by Neil Diamond
Uni Records singles
Song recordings produced by Tom Catalano